Sphenomorphus jobiensis is a species of skink. It is found in New Guinea, the Admiralty Islands, Bismarck Archipelago, and eastern Indonesia (Misool, Salawati, Aru Islands, and Yapen).

Names
It is known as komñ in the Kalam language of Papua New Guinea.

Habitat and behavior
Sphenomorphus jobiensis is a terrestrial skink found in forest habitats. It is a relatively large skink that is fast-moving and difficult to catch, and often bites when handled.

References

jobiensis
Skinks of New Guinea
Reptiles described in 1874
Taxa named by Adolf Bernhard Meyer